Jesse Owens is a documentary created by PBS for the American Experience series. The documentary premiered on May 1, 2012. The documentary centers on Jesse Owens and his participation in the 1936 Summer Olympics. The documentary was directed by Laruens Grant.

References

2012 American television episodes
2012 films
American Experience
Cultural depictions of Jesse Owens
Films about Olympic track and field
Films about the 1936 Summer Olympics
Films set in Berlin
American documentary television films